The Bowls Premier League (BPL) is a biannual bowls competition involving teams from around Australia. The competition was founded in 2013 as a way to popularise the sport by presenting in a modernised format, using the term "made-for-television" in its promotion. The competition features faster play, modified rules, colourful clothing and comprehensive television coverage.

The BPL was founded by Bowls Australia and was initially contested by teams from the five major Australian cities plus a New Zealand side and has since expanded to 10 clubs. The week-long event attracts a large number of Australia's best bowls players to compete, as well as several high-profile bowlers from overseas.

History
The first edition of the competition was held in November, 2013 under the name Australian Premier League. The inaugural clubs were Adelaide Endurance, Brisbane Gold, Melbourne Roys, New Zealand Blackjacks, Perth Suns and Sydney Lions, with Brisbane winning the first title.

Two further teams – the Murray Steamers and the Gold Coast Hawks – joined the competition in 2014 to expand the competition to eight. The Murray Steamers defeated Adelaide Endurance in the final of the 2014 competition to be champions for the second running of the event.

In 2016, Bowls Australia announced there would be two tournaments held per year starting from 2017, with one event staged in Auckland in addition to the traditional event at Club Pine Rivers in Brisbane, Queensland. The competition also underwent a name change to reflect the inclusion of the New Zealand leg, renaming to Bowls Premier League.

The Australian leg of the BPL has always been held in November while the first edition of the New Zealand event was held in March.

Adelaide Endurance were replaced by Illawarra Gorillas in 2017.

BPL10 in 2019 marked a significant shift in the competition, as three teams - Gold Coast Hawks, Illawarra Gorillas and New Zealand Blackjacks - did not renew their licence. This opened the door to three new teams - Adelaide Pioneers, Melbourne Pulse and Tweed Heads Ospreys.

In February 2020, Moama Bowling Club hosted the first BPL outside of Brisbane and New Zealand, with the New Zealand version of the event heading to the Victoria-NSW border town until at least 2022.

BPL12, planned to be hosted by Club Pine Rivers in November 2020, was postponed due to COVID. Moama eventually hosted the event in February 2021, with Club Pine Rivers hosting BPL13 and BPL14 later the same year.

BPL14 was later moved to Moama and played in February 2022. The league expanded to 10 teams, dropping the Melbourne Roys and adding the Tasmania Tridents, Melbourne eXtreme and Gold Coast Hawks. The Murray Steamers changed their name to the Moama Steamers.

BPL15 took place in late May 2022 at Pine Rivers, with the same 10 teams in competition.

Event structure 
Originally, BPL competitions began on a Thursday and ended on Sunday. That was eventually changed, with competitions beginning on a Tuesday and ending on a Friday evening.

Each BPL competition runs over the course of four days at one venue in a double round-robin and finals (playoffs) system; this makes for a total of 14 rounds consisting of four matches in each round. Four rounds are held on each of the first three days with two more on the fourth day, followed by the finals in the evening.

The first New Zealand edition of the competition in March, 2017 had its event held from Monday through to Thursday.

All five matches in the final round of each day, as well as the BPL Cup Final are televised on Fox Sports in Australia and Sky Sport in New Zealand, as well as through digital streaming platform Kayo. Bowls Australia also livestream round robin matches during the day via Facebook, using their popular Rinkside Live service.

Competition format
Each match consists of a two five-end sets, with a one-end tie-break played if required. The game format is pairs, with three bowls for each player per end. A team coach also has a substitute player at their disposal which must be used during the game, but only immediately preceding the delivery of a bowl by their team player. Every player in the team, including the sub, must bowl at least nine bowls per game. The team with that wins both sets, or one set and then the tie-break, is the winner.

Instead of spending time rolling the jack, as per normal competitions, the players place the mat and advise the marker the length of the jack they would like to play to. Players have a 30-second shot clock in which they must deliver their bowl from the time the jack is placed at the start of an end or once their opposition bowl has come to a rest. Teams can nominate one Power Play end per set, enabling teams to earn double the shots scored in that end.

Finals system 
Each of the ten teams play each other twice during the competition. At the end of the double round-robin, the top five teams in the standings play off in the finals series.

If teams on the ladder are equal on points they will be split on net total shots (shots for minus shots against).

The finals series includes straight eliminations and double-chance matches.

Prizemoney 
The BPL competition carries a $100,000 prize-pool, with the winning franchise collecting $25,000.

Clubs
The Bowls Premier League expanded to 10 teams for BPL14, held at the Moama Bowling Club.

Former clubs

Champions

BPL All Star Team

Championships by club

BPL Cup 
In 2017, Bowls Australia announced the introduction of the BPL Cup, a nationwide tournament for all clubs in the same mould as football cup competitions, such as the FA Cup.

Each of the eight Australian states and territories hold statewide competitions for all bowls clubs where an eventual state winner will progress to the national BPL Cup finals at Club Pine Rivers.

BPL Cup Champions

Media coverage

See also

Bowls Australia

References

External links
 

Bowls in Australia
Recurring sporting events established in 2013
2013 establishments in Australia
Sports leagues established in 2013
Bowls in New Zealand
Fox Sports (Australian TV network)
Professional sports leagues in Australia